Mellieħa Sports Club is a Maltese sports club based in the town of Mellieħa. Founded in 1947, just after the end of the Second World War, the primary aim was that of promoting and fostering the development of sports in the village and its surroundings, including football, baseball (Mellieħa Northenders), softball (Mellieħa Curves), netball and snooker.

Mellieħa S.C. began as a football club in 1961 and has competed ever since. Their most notable achievement happened in 1992 when they finished runners-up in the Maltese First Division, which earned them a promotion to the Premier League, the top-tier in Maltese football. For the 2020–21 season, they competed in the National Amateur League, finishing 4th in group A before being knocked out in the first round of the promotion play-offs.

Club officials 

Technical staff
 First Team Coach: Antoine Camilleri
 Nursery Head Coach: Brian Bartolo U5-U13, Kevin Gambin U14-U17

Management

 President: Alfred Vella Borg
 Vice-President: Joseph Fenech
 General secretary: Patrick Cutajar
 Football School Chairperson: Margot Cutajar
 Team manager: Hubert Vella
 Treasurer: Joyce Dean
 Ground Manager: Victor Cutajar
 Members: Felicity Anne Tonna, Antoine Vella, Aldo Vella

Player records

Appearances and goalscoring 
 Most appearances: Ray Vella, 377+ (no exact records held); Kevin Gauci, 383
 Record goal scorer: Wayne Borg St. John, 159 in 317 games (2000–2016)
 Most goals in one season: Wayne Borg St. John, 22 (2009–10)
 Oldest player ever: Ray Vella, 46 years

Player of the Year (1961–2016)

Managers 

 Tony Pepperoni (1967–70)
 Alfred Bartolo (1974–76)
 Frankie Zammit (1976–77)
 Carmel Bartolo (1977–78)
 John Calleja (1978–80)
 John Buttigieg (1980–81)
 John Calleja (1981–82)
 Selection Board (1982–83)
 Salvu Vella (1983–84)
 Charlie Grima &  Charlie Fenech (1984–85)
 George Micallef (1985–88)
 Dennis Fenech (1988–94)
 Freddie Cardona (1994–96)
 Euchar Grech &  Nefail Zheyani (1996–97)
 Dennis Fenech (1997–99)
 Ronald Vella (1999–2002)
 Ilir Pelinku (2002–04)
 Dennis Fenech (2004–05)
 Ilir Pelinku (2005–08)
 Ronald Vella (2008–09)
 Kevin Gambin &  Nikolay Filipov(2009–11)
 JoJo Bajada (2011–12)
 Alex Delia (2012–13)
 Dennis Fenech (2013–15)
 Brian Bartolo (2015–16)
 Vojko Martinovic &  Alex Delia (2016–17)
 Alex Delia (2017–18)
 Brian Bartolo (2018-2021)
 Antoine Camilleri (2022- )

Honours

League 

 First Division
Runners-up (1): 1991–92

 Second Division
Winners (1): 1990–91
Runners-up (1): 2006–07

 Third Division
Winners (2): 1961–62, 1988–89
Runners-up (1): 2017–18

 Fourth Division
Winners (1): 1975–76

Cup 

 Second/Third Division FA Cup
Winners (1): 2003–04

 Fourth Division Cup
Winners (1): 1978–79

Christmas Cup
Winners (1): 1972–73

References

External links 

 
 Profile on Malta Football Association's website

Football clubs in Malta
1961 establishments in Malta
Mellieħa
Association football clubs established in 1961